Protocol pipelining is a technique in which multiple requests are written out to a single socket without waiting for the corresponding responses. Pipelining can be used in various application layer network protocols, like HTTP/1.1, SMTP and FTP.

The pipelining of requests results in a dramatic improvement in protocol performance, especially over high latency connections (such as satellite Internet connections). Pipelining reduces waiting time of a process.

See also 
 HTTP pipelining

References

External links 
 HTTP/1.1 Pipelining FAQ at mozilla.org
 "Network Performance Effects of HTTP/1.1, CSS1, and PNG" at w3.org
 FTP pipelining
  SMTP Service Extension for Command Pipelining (STD 60)

Network protocols